Jeppe Feldsted Brandrup (born 3 June 1985) is a Danish professional football player, currently playing for FC Græsrødderne. He can play the positions as right-footed defender and right wingback as well as central midfielder.

Brandrup played in KB, one of the two clubs behind F.C. Copenhagen, since his early childhood. While at KB, he made his debut for the Danish youth national teams in September 2001 and played 4 matches at the 2002 UEFA European Under-17 Football Championship.

Jeppe was promoted to the first team in 2005. He debuted on 2005-08-07 against Aarhus GF where he Álvaro Santos on the left winger position. Jeppe did not score for FCK.

Honours
Danish Superliga: 2005-06 & 2006-07 (with Copenhagen)

External links
Danish national team profile

1985 births
Living people
Danish men's footballers
Danish Superliga players
F.C. Copenhagen players
Randers FC players
Silkeborg IF players
Lyngby Boldklub players
Association football fullbacks
Association football defenders
Footballers from Copenhagen